The 2019 Emperor's Cup was the 99th edition of the annual Japanese national football cup tournament. The tournament began on 25 May and ended with the final on 1 January 2020. The final was the first event held at the National Stadium after its rebuilding.

The defending champions were Urawa Red Diamonds, but they lost to Honda FC in the Round of 16.

Vissel Kobe won their first trophy after winning the final. As the winners, they automatically qualified to the group stage of the 2020 AFC Champions League.

Calendar

First round
The draw for the first three rounds was held on 4 April 2019.

Second round

Third round

Fourth round
The draw for the Fourth Round to the final was held on 16 August 2019. There was no seeding in the draw, however, the draw took into consideration the teams whose home or away in the round of 16 were predetermined:
 Kashima Antlers and Urawa Red Diamonds, who were to play the round of 16 home due to the participations in 2019 AFC Champions League quarter-finals, could not be drawn in the same tie.
 Yokohama F. Marinos, Honda FC and Hosei University, who were to play the round of 16 away since they could not provide stadiums on the designated match day, could not be drawn in the same tie each other.

The round of 16 matches were played on 18 September 2019, except for the matches involving Kashima Antlers and Urawa Red Diamonds, which were delayed as they were playing in the second leg of the 2019 AFC Champions League quarter-finals.

Quarter-finals

Semi-finals

Final

The final was played on 1 January 2020 at the newly rebuilt National Stadium in Tokyo.

References

External links

Emperor's Cup
Emperor's Cup
Cup
2020 in Japanese football